This is a list of Chinese football transfers for the 2011 season winter transfer window. Only moves from Super League and League One are listed. The transfer window was opened from 30 December 2010 to 21 March 2011.

Super League

Beijing Guoan

In:

Out:

Changchun Yatai

In:

 

Out:

Chengdu Blades

In:

Out:

Dalian Shide

In:

Out:

Guangzhou Evergrande

In:

 

 
 
 
 

 

 

Out:

Hangzhou Greentown

In:

Out:

Henan Construction

In:

 

Out:

Jiangsu Sainty

In:

 

 

 
 

Out:

Liaoning Whowin

In:

 
 

Out:

Nanchang Hengyuan

In:

 

Out:

Qingdao Jonoon

In:

Out:

Shaanxi Baorong Chanba

In:

Out:

Shandong Luneng

In:
 
 

 

Out:

Shanghai Shenhua

In:

 

 

Out:

Shenzhen Ruby

In:

 
 
 
 

 

Out:

Tianjin Teda

In:

 

Out:

League One

Beijing Baxy

In:

Out:

Beijing Technology

In:

Out:

Chongqing Lifan

In:

 

Out:

Dalian Aerbin

In:

 
 
 
 

 
 

 

Out:

Guangdong Sunray Cave

In:

 

Out:

Guizhou Zhicheng

In:

Out:

Hunan Billows

In:

Out:

Hubei Wuhan Zhongbo

In:

 

	

Out:

Shanghai East Asia

In:

Out:

Shenyang Dongjin

In:

 
 

 

 
 
 

 
 

 

Out:

Shenzhen Phoenix

In:

Out:

Tianjin Runyulong

In:

Out:

Tianjin Songjiang

In:

 

 

 

Out:

Yanbian Changbai Tiger

In:

Out:

References

China
2010-11